Jack Holveck (born May 26, 1943) is an American politician in the state of Iowa.

Holveck was born in Marshalltown, Iowa. He attended William Penn College and University of Iowa and is a lawyer. A Democrat, he served in the Iowa House of Representatives from 1983 to 1995 (84th district from 1983 to 1993 and 72nd district from 1993 to 2001) Iowa Senate from 1995 to 2003 (36th district 2001 to 2003 and 32nd district from 2003 to 2005).

References

1943 births
Living people
People from Marshall County, Iowa
William Penn University alumni
University of Iowa alumni
Iowa lawyers
Democratic Party members of the Iowa House of Representatives
Democratic Party Iowa state senators